The Men's Greco-Roman bantamweight at the 1968 Summer Olympics as part of the wrestling program were held at the Insurgentes Ice Rink. The bantamweight was the second-lightest weight class, allowing wrestlers up to 57 kilograms.

Medalists

Tournament results 

The competition used a form of negative points tournament, with negative points given for any result short of a fall. Accumulation of 6 negative points eliminated the wrestler. When only two or three wrestlers remain, a special final round is used to determine the order of the medals.

Legend
TF — Won by Fall
DQ — Won by Passivity or forfeit
D2 — Both wrestlers lost by Passivity
DNA — Did not appear
TPP — Total penalty points
MPP — Match penalty points

Penalties
0 — Won by Fall and Disqualification
0.5 — Won by Technical Superiority
1 — Won by Points
2 — Draw
2.5 — Draw, Passivity
3 — Lost by Points
3.5 — Lost by Technical Superiority
4 — Lost by Fall and Disqualification

1st round

2nd round

3rd round

4th round

5th round

6th round

Final round (2nd-4th places) 

Results from the preliminary round are carried forward into the final (shown in yellow).

Final standings 
 
 
 
 
 
  and

References

External links
Official Report

Greco-Roman 57kg